George Parker, 4th Earl of Macclesfield PC (24 February 1755 – 20 March 1842), styled Viscount Parker between 1764 and 1795, was a British peer and politician who sat in the House of Commons between  1777 and 1795.

Background
Macclesfield was the son of Thomas Parker, 3rd Earl of Macclesfield, and Mary, daughter of Sir William Heathcote, 1st Baronet.

Political career
Macclesfield was returned to Parliament for Woodstock in 1777, a seat he held until 1784, and later represented Minehead between 1790 and 1795. In 1791 he was sworn of the Privy Council and appointed Comptroller of the Household, which he remained until 1797. In 1795 he succeeded his father in the earldom and entered the House of Lords. From 1804 to 1830 he held office as Captain of the Yeomen of the Guard under eight different prime ministers.

During the French Revolutionary War he raised the County Fencible Cavalry in Oxfordshire, later the Watlington Cavalry, precursor of the Oxfordshire Yeomanry, and was appointed its Captain on 20 June 1798.

He was elected a fellow of the Royal Society in November 1818.

Family
Lord Macclesfield married Mary Frances, daughter of Reverend Thomas Drake, in 1780. She died in January 1823. Macclesfield died in March 1842, aged 87, and was succeeded in the earldom by his younger brother, Thomas.

Canal and Park
Lord Macclesfield was a director of the Regent's Canal from 1812 and its chairman from 1816. He was appointed as a commissioner of the Crown Estate Paving Commission in August 1824. As chair of the canal company, he saw it through its most testing times as a variety of problems and obstacles had to be surmounted before the canal could be opened in 1820.

References

1755 births
1842 deaths
Parker, George Parker, Viscount
Parker, George Parker, Viscount
Parker, George Parker, Viscount
Earls in the Peerage of Great Britain
Lord-Lieutenants of Oxfordshire
Queen's Own Oxfordshire Hussars officers
Parker, George Parker, Viscount
Members of the Privy Council of the United Kingdom
Parker, George Parker, Viscount
Fellows of the Royal Society
George
Earls of Macclesfield